White Hen Pantry (known as White Hen in the Midwest) was a Lombard, Illinois-based chain of approximately 261 predominantly franchisee-owned convenience stores located in and around Detroit, Boston / southern New Hampshire, southern Wisconsin, northwest Indiana and central Illinois areas of the United States.  Most of the stores were open 24 hours and offered an array of standard convenience store fare such as coffees, cappuccinos, frozen and dry goods and toiletries. Many also had full delis serving boxed sandwiches and salads, name-brand meats and cheeses and fresh fruits and vegetables. White Hen's array of services included catering options and sales of external holiday gift cards. Most stores also had ATMs and provide lottery ticket sales; White Hen was the largest lottery ticket vendor in the state of Illinois.

Most of the White Hen Pantry locations were rebranded as 7-Eleven stores by the end of 2010.

History

20th century
White Hen Pantry was founded by Jewel Tea Company (now Jewel-Osco) as Kwik Shoppe and began franchising in July 1965, borrowing the idea from Texas-based 7-11 stores which were the first convenience stores. The first location opened in 1965 with the name Kwik Shoppe and was located at 20 E. Golf Road in Des Plaines, IL. A few months later, it adopted the White Hen Pantry name, taken from Jewel's egg supplier, White Hen Egg Farms. The next stores to open, also in 1965, were located at 6 S. Park Boulevard in Glen Ellyn, IL, 1045 S. York Road in Bensenville, IL and 155 E. 1st Street in Elmhurst, IL.

After American Stores purchased Jewel in 1984, White Hen Pantry was sold to its management team and became an independent company.

2000s
In 2001 it was sold to Clark Retail Enterprises, Inc., which immediately sold all 55 White Hen Pantry stores in Massachusetts and New Hampshire to New England Pantry, Inc. This deal formed New England Pantry's status as a sub-franchisor of the White Hen Pantry brand, and its exclusive franchisor in the New England area.

In 2005 and the first part of 2006, White Hen franchises underwent a series of ups and downs. In the third quarter of 2005 the company planned to increase its store count in the Chicago area by as much as 25 over the course of 2006.  While still foreseeing eventual growth, the company changed its immediate plans and planned to sell 15 of its stores in 2006. One explanation for its revamped course of action came from its push toward serving freshly prepared deli offerings to replace stagnating sales of tobacco and other traditional convenience store wares. In summer 2005, White Hen's push toward deli-fresh offerings was strong in Chicago, where it offered free samples of its private label Pantry Select chips at an August Chicago Cubs baseball game. Its new deli-fresh focus reportedly failed to meet the needs of some of the many demographics to which the store catered, hurting the quick growth for which it had originally planned.

In line with its focus on deli-fresh goods, White Hen opened what it billed as a "store of the future" in Chicago's Wicker Park neighborhood on April 17, 2006. In addition to offering White Hen's standard fare, this particular venue offered "an expanded line-up of natural and organic foods, fresh Pantry Select green salads . . . and a toasted-to-order Hot & Fresh sandwich program with a state-of-the-art touch screen ordering system."

On August 11, 2006, White Hen Pantry, Inc. was purchased by Seven & I Holdings Co., Japan's No. 1 retailer and the operator of 7-Eleven convenience stores in the United States. White Hen CEO Brandon Barnholt cited the merger as a great opportunity for the company, its franchisers and its customers. In the months following the acquisition, White Hen stores continued to function as they had.

In July 2007, some White Hen stores began to be converted to 7-Eleven stores. Eventually, the White Hen name disappeared from the converted stores, having been replaced with the 7-Eleven branding.

2010s 
The White Hen logo continued for a time to be used for some prepared foods such as sandwiches, under the "Pantry Select" brand.  Deli counters and products were removed and replaced with standard 7-Eleven offerings. In October 2013, a White Hen Pantry store located in Boston, Massachusetts closed, preparing for a conversion to 7-Eleven. Some locations still existed until 2016.

References

External links 
Official Website (Chicago Area)
New England Website

Lombard, Illinois
Companies based in DuPage County, Illinois
Defunct retail companies of the United States
American companies established in 1965
Retail companies established in 1965
Retail companies disestablished in 2013
Economy of Massachusetts
New England
Economy of the Northeastern United States
Convenience stores of the United States
7-Eleven
2006 mergers and acquisitions